Lisa Marie or Lisa-Marie may refer to:

People
Lisa Marie (actress) (born 1968), American model and actress
Lisa-Marie Long, British television presenter and actress
Lisa Marie Nowak, a United States naval officer and former NASA astronaut
Lisa Marie Presley (born 1968), daughter of Elvis Presley
Lisa Marie Scott (born 1974), American model and actress
Lisa Marie Varon (born 1971), American professional wrestler
Lisa-Marie Vizaniari (born 1971), Australian discus thrower
Lisa-Marie Woods (born 1984), Norwegian football midfielder

Fictional entity
Lisa Simpson, a fictional character whose full name is Lisa Marie Simpson